Seksan Prasertkul (born 1949) is a Thai author who was awarded the title National Artist of Thailand in 2009.

Seksan became a student leader at Thammasat University and was active in the October 1973 protests against the military government of Thanom Kittikachorn.

Seksan is the author of poetry, stories, and his autobiography, was made into a movie, The Moonhunter.

Early life
Seksan is the son of a fishing-boat builder and a market vendor. He graduated from high school at Chonkanyanakul School in Chonburi province, and received an AFS scholarship. He was an exchange student at a high school in the United States in 1967 and 1968. On his return to Thailand, he gained admission to Thammasat University by his high scores on the nationwide university entrance exam.

Leading up to 14 October 1973
Sulak Sivaraksa "initiated forums for students to discuss current social issues. Among those attending was Seksan", according to Historical Dictionary of Thailand.

After the Thammasat University Massacre
After the 6 October 1976 Thammasat University Massacre, he took refuge with the communist insurgents in northeastern Thailand. However, he found the insurgents to be very dogmatic and not at all sympathetic to the students' democratic goals. When the Thai government offered an amnesty to those who had fled, he surrendered in 1980 and returned home. He went to the United States for graduate study and received a doctorate from Cornell University in 1989. He has since taught political science at Thammasat University, where he is a well known and respected figure.

Works
Ruedukan  ("seasons"—short stories)
"bamboo flowers"
"coming from the mangrove forest"
Manutsayatham Kap Kan Tosu Thang Chon Chan
"Song of the Water, Dance of the Clouds"
Life University
Hiking in the Wood in Search of Real Life
Wandering in Search of Fish
"Life and Writing Books"
"Stream and Crosswalk"
"Song of the Universe"
"Waves of Liberty"
"Song of the Universe"
"Stream and Crosswalk"
"Moment of Defeat"
"Man and Tiger" (short stories)
"Bubbles of Time" (short stories)
Khon la chan: 14 Tula songkhram prachachon ("14
October, the people’s war")
Bangyang thi haipai: Ruam botkhwam kieokap satpa læ thammachat
Khlun seriphap: Riang khwam 7 huakho
Phleng ekkaphop: Banthuk khon doenthang
Phleng nam rabam mek
Rudukan: Ruang san læ botkawi (Chut "ruang san Thai")

Works translated to English
"A bamboo bridge over rapids" (translated by Marcel Barang)

Private
He married Chiranan Pitpreecha. She won a SEA Write Award in 1989. The couple has since separated.

References

External links
The chronicle of Seksan Prasertkul
Seksan: Thai society is on the verge of a volcano
Readers as dopes

Seksan Prasertkul
1949 births
Living people
Seksan Prasertkul
Seksan Prasertkul
Seksan Prasertkul
Seksan Prasertkul
Seksan Prasertkul
Cornell University alumni
Seksan Prasertkul
Seksan Prasertkul
Seksan Prasertkul
20th-century male writers
21st-century male writers
Seksan Prasertkul
Seksan Prasertkul